Luis Peteiro Ramos (born 26 May 1998) is a Spanish footballer who plays as a right back for SD Huesca B.

Club career
Born in Madrid, Peteiro represented Vallecas CF, Rayo Vallecano and CF Trival Valderas as a youth, and made his senior debut for the latter's B-team in the 2017–18 season, in the regional leagues. In January 2018, he moved back to Vallecas after overcoming a serious knee injury.

Ahead of the 2018–19 campaign, Peteiro moved to CD Betis San Isidro, still in the lower leagues. After being a regular starter he signed for CF Fuenlabrada, being initially assigned to the reserves in the sixth division.

Peteiro made his first-team debut on 8 August 2020, starting in a 1–2 away loss at Deportivo de La Coruña in the Segunda División, as several first-team players were out due to a COVID-19 outbreak in the squad. He subsequently appeared exclusively with the B's before joining another reserve team, Extremadura UD B of the Tercera División RFEF, on 26 July 2021.

In January 2022, as Extremadura's financial problems worsened and most of the first team players left the club, Peteiro was definitely promoted to the main squad in Primera División RFEF, and played seven matches before the club's elimination from the competition. On 23 March, he signed for SD Huesca B in Segunda División RFEF.

References

External links
FutMadrid profile 

1998 births
Living people
Footballers from Madrid
Spanish footballers
Association football defenders
Segunda División players
Primera Federación players
Segunda Federación players
Tercera Federación players
Divisiones Regionales de Fútbol players
CF Trival Valderas players
CF Fuenlabrada B players
CF Fuenlabrada footballers
Extremadura UD B players
Extremadura UD footballers
SD Huesca B players